In physics, there is a speculative hypothesis that, if there were a black hole with the same mass, charge and angular momentum as an electron, it would share other properties of the electron. Most notably, Brandon Carter showed in 1968 that the magnetic moment of such an object would match that of an electron. This is interesting because calculations ignoring special relativity and treating the electron as a small rotating sphere of charge give a magnetic moment roughly half the experimental value (see Gyromagnetic ratio).

However, Carter's calculations also show that a would-be black hole with these parameters would be "super-extremal". Thus, unlike a true black hole, this object would display a naked singularity, meaning a singularity in spacetime not hidden behind an event horizon. It would also give rise to closed timelike curves.

Standard quantum electrodynamics (QED), currently the most comprehensive theory of particles, treats the electron as a point particle. There is no evidence that the electron is a black hole (or naked singularity) or not. Furthermore, since the electron is quantum-mechanical in nature, any description purely in terms of general relativity is paradoxical until a better model based on understanding of quantum nature of blackholes and gravitational behaviour of quantum particles is developed by research. Hence, the idea of a black hole electron remains strictly hypothetical.

Details
An article published in 1938 by Albert Einstein, Leopold Infeld and Banesh Hoffmann showed that, if elementary particles are treated as singularities in spacetime, it is unnecessary to postulate geodesic motion as part of general relativity. The electron may be treated as such a singularity.

If one ignores the electron's angular momentum and charge, as well as the effects of quantum mechanics, one can treat the electron as a black hole and attempt to compute its radius. The Schwarzschild radius  of a mass  is the radius of the event horizon for a non-rotating, uncharged black hole of that mass. It is given by

For the electron,
  = ,
so
  = .

Thus, if we ignore the electric charge and angular momentum of the electron, and naively apply general relativity on this very small length scale without taking quantum theory into account, a black hole of the electron's mass would have this radius.

In reality, physicists expect quantum-gravity effects to become significant even at much larger length scales, comparable to the Planck length

So, the above purely classical calculation cannot be trusted. Furthermore, even classically, electric charge and angular momentum affect the properties of a black hole. To take them into account, while still ignoring quantum effects, one should use the Kerr–Newman metric. If we do, we find that the angular momentum and charge of the electron are too large for a black hole of the electron's mass: a Kerr–Newman object with such a large angular momentum and charge would instead be "super-extremal", displaying a naked singularity, meaning a singularity not shielded by an event horizon.

To see that this is so, it suffices to consider the electron's charge and neglect its angular momentum. In the Reissner–Nordström metric, which describes electrically charged but non-rotating black holes, there is a quantity , defined by

For an electron with  = − = , this gives a value
  = .

Since this (vastly) exceeds the Schwarzschild radius, the Reissner–Nordström metric has a naked singularity.

If we include the effects of the electron's rotation using the Kerr–Newman metric, there is still a naked singularity, which is now a ring singularity, and spacetime also has closed timelike curves. The size of this ring singularity is on the order of

This gives
  = ,
which is much larger than the length scale  associated with the electron's charge. As noted by Carter, this length  is on the order of the electron's Compton wavelength. Unlike the Compton wavelength, it is not quantum-mechanical in nature.

More recently, Alexander Burinskii has pursued the idea of treating the electron as a Kerr–Newman naked singularity.

See also

 Quantum gravity
 Abraham–Lorentz force
 Black hole thermodynamics
 Entropic force
 Hawking radiation
 List of quantum gravity researchers
 Entropic elasticity of an ideal chain
 Gravitation
 Induced gravity
 Geon (physics)
 Micro black hole
 Geometrodynamics

References

Further reading

Popular literature
 Brian Greene, The Elegant Universe: Superstrings, Hidden Dimensions, and the Quest for the Ultimate Theory (1999), (See chapter 13)
 John A. Wheeler, Geons, Black Holes & Quantum Foam (1998), (See chapter 10)

Black holes
Quantum gravity
Hypothetical elementary particles